The history of communism encompasses a wide variety of ideologies and political movements sharing the core theoretical values of common ownership of wealth, economic enterprise, and property. Most modern forms of communism are grounded at least nominally in Marxism, a theory and method conceived by Karl Marx during the 19th century. Marxism subsequently gained a widespread following across much of Europe and throughout the late 1800s its militant supporters were instrumental in a number of failed revolutions on that continent. During the same era, there was also a proliferation of communist parties which rejected armed revolution, but embraced the Marxist ideal of collective property and a classless society.

Although Marxist theory suggested that the places ripest for social revolution, either through peaceful transition or by force of arms, were industrial societies, communism was mostly successful in underdeveloped countries with endemic poverty such as the Russian Empire and the Republic of China. In 1917, the Bolshevik Party seized power during the Russian Revolution and in 1922 created the Soviet Union, the world's first self-declared socialist state. The Bolsheviks thoroughly embraced the concept of proletarian internationalism and world revolution, seeing their struggle as an international rather than a purely regional cause. This was to have a phenomenal impact on the spread of communism during the 20th century as the Soviet Union installed new Marxist–Leninist governments in Central and Eastern Europe following World War II and indirectly backed the ascension of others in the Americas, Asia and Africa. Pivotal to this policy was the Communist International, also known as the Comintern, formed with the perspective of aiding and assisting communist parties around the world and fostering revolution. This was one major cause of tensions during the Cold War as the United States and its military allies equated the global spread of communism with Soviet expansionism by proxy.

By 1985, one-third of the world's population lived under a Marxist–Leninist system of government in one form or another. However, there was significant debate among communist and Marxist ideologues as to whether most of these countries could be meaningfully considered Marxist at all since many of the basic components of the Marxist system were altered and revised by such countries. The failure of these governments to live up to the ideal of a communist society, their general trend towards increasing authoritarianism and the inherent inefficiencies in their economies has been linked to the decline of communism in the late 20th century. With the dissolution of the Soviet Union in 1991, several Marxist–Leninist states repudiated or abolished the ideology altogether. As of the 21st century, only a small number of Marxist–Leninist states remain, namely China, Cuba, Laos, North Korea and Vietnam. All of these states have started allowing more economic competition while maintaining one-party rule.

Origins of communism

Communism in antiquity 

Many historical groups have been considered as following forms of communism. Karl Marx and other early communist theorists believed that hunter-gatherer societies as were found in the Paleolithic through to horticultural societies as found in the Chalcolithic were essentially egalitarian and he, therefore, termed their ideology to be primitive communism. One of the first writers to espouse a belief in the primitive communism of the past was the Roman Stoic philosopher Seneca who stated," How happy was the primitive age when the bounties of nature lay in common...They held all nature in common which gave them secure possession of the public wealth." Because of this he believed that such primitive societies were the richest as there was no poverty. Other Greco-Roman writers that believed in a prehistoric humanity that practiced communism include Diodorus Siculus, Virgil, and Ovid. Similarly the early Church Fathers, like their pagan predecessors, maintained that humans society had declined to its current state from a now lost egalitarian social order.

Around the late 5th century BC in Ancient Greece, ideas similar to communism were becoming widespread to the extent that they were parodied by the dramatist Aristophanes in his comedy The Assemblywomen in which the women of Athens seize control of the Ecclesia or city government and abolish all private property while making the sharing of women and the collective rearing of children mandatory. Over a decade later in Plato's Republic Socrates declares that an ideal state would eliminate all forms of private property among the elite of society to the extent that even children and wives are shared. He asserts that such practices would prevent internal conflict within a society and promote a sense of unity and common identity. Around AD 500 in Iran, the Zoroastrian priest and reformist Mazdak purportedly founded a movement preaching religious communism while under the patronage of the Sassanian King Kavad I who initially supported the priest and his reforms, but later had the Mazdakians repressed and Mazdak executed.

Developments in Christian communism 

Early Christianity supported a form of common ownership based on the teachings in the New Testament which emphasised sharing. For example, in the Book of Acts the passages  and  state all believers held their possessions communally and would distribute goods based on need. Additionally, the related Jewish sect known as the Essenes was committed to, "social and material egalitarianism." Despite these practices falling into decline even before the era of Constantine, the principles of sharing property and holding goods in common continued within the Christian traditions of monasticism.

From the High Middle Ages to the early modern period in Europe, various groups supporting Christian communist and communalist ideas were occasionally adopted by reformist Christian sects. An early 12th century proto-Protestant group originating in Lyon, Kingdom of Burgundy-Arles known as the Waldensians held their property in common in accordance with the Book of Acts, but were persecuted by the Catholic Church and retreated to the Piedmont. Some Waldensians led a schism after they felt the groups leader was becoming authoritarian. With the rise of the Mendicant Orders in the 13th century groups such as the Franciscans began challenging the concept of private property to the extent it had to be defended by Pope John XXII in his 1328 papal bull Quia vir reprobus, in which he ruled that because God had gifted Adam with the Earth as his domain, the ownership of property was divinely sanctioned. Also beginning in the 13th century a lay order known as the Beghards, originating in the Low Countries, started to spread among the underprivileged groups of society, taking in members who renounced private property and dedicated themselves to communal living and pious, frugal lifestyles as artisans. Although the practices were successful enough to spread to other areas on the continent such as France and Germany, the Beghards were later repeatedly condemned by the Catholic Church. Around 1300 the Apostolic Brethren in northern Italy were taken over by Fra Dolcino who formed a sect known as the Dulcinians which advocated ending feudalism, dissolving hierarchies in the church, and holding all property in common. The 14th century English scholastic and founder of Lollardy, John Wycliffe, preached of an idealized Christian state with collective ownership and disapproved of those rejecting the, "common charity and common property of Christian men." Around the same time the revolutionary priest John Ball, who was later executed for his prominent role in the doomed Wat Tyler Rebellion allegedly declared, "things cannot go well in England, nor ever will, until all goods are held in common." 

In Tábor, Bohemia during the 15th century Hussite Wars, the radical Taborites attempted to institute a system they called a "community of goods" where, "there is no mine or thine but all is held in common", but once initiated the scheme was quickly abandoned. They have been considered precursors of totalitarian governance while under leadership of the dictatorial Jan Želivský. After Taborite power was broken at Lipany their successors fled to Moravia forming the Moravian Church under the pacifist spiritual leader Petr Chelčický who harbored both Christian communist and Christian anarchist beliefs. The extent to which Chelčický's followers, also known as the Bohemian Brethren, adhered to his ideals, namely the abstinence from property, trade, and government, is disputed, and by the 16th century the Brethren definitely no longer embraced them. During the Protestant Reformation of the 16th century the radical Anabaptists, who originated in Switzerland, endorsed the communalization of goods as practiced in the Book of Acts. The most notable Anabaptist groups were the Hutterites, founded by Jacob Hutter, who settled in Moravia in the 1520s and the Münster Anabaptists who were eradicated in battle during their attempt in 1535 to forcibly convert the city of Münster into a theocratic New Jerusalem. Various groups on the side of the Roundheads during the English Civil War in the mid-17th century propagated the redistribution of wealth on an egalitarian basis, namely the Levellers and the Diggers although only the latter group under Gerrard Winstanley promoted a propertyless, communist society.

European writers began depicting idealized communist societies in utopian fiction from the 16th century onward. Inspired by largely fictional accounts of native communities in the New World, the English humanist and future Lord Chancellor Thomas More, wrote the utopian novel Utopia (1516) in which the main character decries private property after traveling to an idyllic island without money or private property and where, "everything is under state control." More coined the term utopia as a name for his idealized community, which means "nowhere" in Latin, evincing the fact that More did not consider such a society attainable in reality. Tommaso Campanella's 1601 work The City of the Sun propagated the concept of a society where the products of society should be shared equally. In Campanella's utopia all people are well educated, there is only a four-hour work day, there is no private property, the population practices eugenics to improve mental and physical fitness, most time is devoted to either leisure or self improvement, and society is managed by a ruling scientist who bases his administration on scientific principles all in the interest of benefiting society as a whole. Utopian communist societies were also described by the French writers François Fénelon and Denis Vairasse while English writer Francis Bacon wrote of a utopia that merely had a "communism in knowledge."

Communism during the Enlightenment 
During the Age of Enlightenment in 18th century France, some liberal writers increasingly began to criticize the institution of private property even to the extent they demanded its abolition. One of the first secular visions for a communist society is contained within the French Catholic abbé Jean Meslier's posthumously published Testament (1729). Similarly the Abbé de Mably, also a French philosopher wrote that the individual ownership of land was the source of all mischief and that wealthy inequality brought about social ruin that could only be reversed by adopting a society based on collective ownership." He did however temper his views by surmising that any attempts at enacting true equality and communal ownership would prove to be too costly and destructive to be worth implementing. Another French thinker, Étienne-Gabriel Morelly also contended that private property was the source of all vice in society and developed the basic principles for a communist society namely, the abolition of property, the right to live and work for all, and the duty of all citizens to work for the common good. The French philosopher Jean Jacques Rousseau in his hugely influential The Social Contract (1762) outlined the basis for a political order based on popular sovereignty rather than the rule of monarchs, and in his Discourse on Inequality (1755) inveighed against the corrupting effects of private property claiming that the invention of private property had led to the," crimes, wars, murders, and suffering" that plagued civilization. 

In 1785 the popular French novelist Restif de la Bretonne wrote a book review on Victor d'Hupay's 1779 book Project for a Philosophical Community which described a plan for a communal experiment in Marseille where all private property was banned and which could be considered," the first full blueprint for a secular communist society in the world." In the review Restif noted that d'Hupay had referred to himself as a communiste, the French form of the word "communist", in a 1782 letter, the first recorded instance of that term. Restif himself wrote many novels centered around the idea of eliminating private property, first using the term "community of goods" in 1783 and then the term "communism" in 1793, rendered in French as communisme.

These currents of thought in French philosophy proved influential during the French Revolution of 1789 in which various anti-monarchists, particularly the Jacobins, supported the idea of redistributing wealth equally among the people, including Jean-Paul Marat and Gracchus Babeuf. The latter was involved in the Conspiracy of the Equals of 1796 intending to establish a revolutionary regime based on communal ownership, egalitarianism and the redistribution of property. Babeuf was directly influenced by Morelly's anti-property utopian novel The Code of Nature and quoted it extensively, although he was under the erroneous impression it was written by Diderot.Also during the revolution the publisher Nicholas Bonneville, the founder of the Parisian revolutionary Social Club used his printing press to spread the communist treatises of Restif and Sylvain Maréchal. Maréchal, who later joined Babeuf's conspiracy, would state in his Manifesto of the Equals (1796)," we aim at something more sublime and more just, the COMMON GOOD or the COMMUNITY OF GOODS" and "The French Revolution is just a precursor of another revolution, far greater, far more solemn, which will be the last." Restif also continued to write and publish books on the topic of communism throughout the Revolution. Accordingly, through their egalitarian programs and agitation Restif, Maréchal, and Babeuf became the progenitors of modern communism. Babeuf's plot was detected, however, and he and several others involved were arrested and executed. Because of his views and methods, Babeuf is sometimes referred to as the first revolutionary communist, although at the time Babeuf himself used the term "communitist". Despite this setback, the example of the French Revolutionary regime and Babeuf's doomed insurrection was an inspiration for French socialist thinkers such as Henri de Saint-Simon, Louis Blanc, Charles Fourier and Pierre-Joseph Proudhon. Proudhon, the founder of modern anarchism and libertarian socialism would later famously declare "property is theft!" a phrase first invented by the French revolutionary Brissot de Warville.

Post-French Revolution communism 
Importantly because one of Babeuf's co-conspirators, Philippe Buonarroti, survived the crackdown on the Conspiracy of the Equals he was able, later in his life, to write the influential book Babeuf's Conspiracy for Equality first published in 1828 which chronicled and popularized Babeouf's beliefs. In it Buonarroti asserted that in society," burdens, productions, and advantages ought to be equally divided," and believed that this division would lead to," the greatest possible happiness of all." Bournatti's writings led to a revival of Babeuf's thought in France and the dissemination of political theories referred to as Neo-Babouvism. According to Bournatti's Neo-Babouvism a revolutionary elite of "wise and courageous" citizens who cared only for "ensuring the triumph of equality" would be needed to uplift the masses and establish a new society based on egalitarian principles.

By the 1830s and 1840s, the egalitarian concepts of communism and the related ideas of socialism had become widely popular in French revolutionary circles thanks to the writings of social critics and philosophers such as Pierre Leroux and Théodore Dézamy, whose critiques of bourgeoisie liberalism and individualism led to a widespread intellectual rejection of laissez-faire capitalism on economic, philosophical and moral grounds. According to Leroux writing in 1832, "To recognise no other aim than individualism is to deliver the lower classes to brutal exploitation. The proletariat is no more than a revival of antique slavery." He also asserted that private ownership of the means of production allowed for the exploitation of the lower classes and that private property was a concept divorced from human dignity. Dézamy would assert in his 1842 book  that what was needed was a," complete and unrestricted society of communal property" in which all activity was centralized. The systematic, historical and materialist analysis of the nature of communism in Dézamy's work led Marx to consider him among the first scientific socialists along with Jules Gay. It was only in the year 1840 that proponents of common ownership in France, including the socialists Théodore Dézamy, Étienne Cabet, and Jean-Jacques Pillot began to widely adopt the word "communism" as a term for their belief system.

A landmark event that established the popularity of the communist movement in France occurred in 1840 when Dézamy along with Pillot and Albert Laponneraye organized a pro-communist banquet in Belleville, France, the "first public manifestation of the communist party" in France which proved so successful that further planned communist banquets had to be outlawed by the French government. Also in 1840 a society of "Egalitarian Workers" following a communist program was founded in Paris and a general strike was called whose leaders were reportedly inspired by communist ideals. During the 1840s Étienne Cabet had a following of between 100,000 and 200,000 French workers and was considered by Friedrich Engels to be the representative of the French proletariat. One of the most prominent and influential French communists of the 1840s was Auguste Blanqui who was notable for his belief that violent revolutionary action should be used to overthrow the bourgeosie dominated state. In Blanqui's estimation a revolution would be most successful if it was executed by a small, secretive group which could then install a "dictatorship of the proletariat." Dézamy disagreed with any program endorsing a dictatorship, believing instead that the chief focus should be on cultivating proletarian unity through propaganda and education.

The works and teachings of these French writers, many now self identifying as communists, went on to inspire new communist groups such as the League of the Just, an organization founded in Paris in 1836 by the Christian communist German émigrés Wilhelm Weitling and Karl Schapper. A second group, the Communist Correspondence Committee, was formed in Brussels in 1846 by another pair of German émigrés Karl Marx and Friedrich Engels. The two groups were merged in 1847 to form the Communist League which was headed by Schapper who then proceeded to task the co-founding members Marx and Engels with writing a manifesto laying out the principles of the new political party.

Marxism

Karl Marx 

In the 1840s, German philosopher and sociologist Karl Marx, who was living in England after fleeing the authorities in Prussia, where he was considered a political threat, began publishing books in which he outlined his theories for a variety of communism now known as Marxism. Marx was financially aided and supported by another German émigré, Friedrich Engels (1820–1895), who like Marx had fled from the German authorities in 1849. Marx and Engels took on many influences from earlier socialists such as the Utopian socialist Saint-Simonist school. Politically, they were influenced by Maximilien Robespierre and several other radical figures of the French Revolution whilst economically they were influenced by David Ricardo. Philosophically, they were influenced by Georg Wilhelm Friedrich Hegel. Engels regularly met Marx at Chetham's Library in Manchester, England from 1845 and the alcove where they met remains identical to this day. It was here that Engels relayed his experiences of industrial Manchester, chronicled in the Condition of the Working Class in England, highlighting the struggles of the working class.

Marx stated that "the history of all hitherto existing society is the history of class struggles", something that he believed was happening between the bourgeoisie (the select few upper class and upper middle class) who then controlled society and the proletariat (the working class masses) who toiled to produce everything, but who had no political control. He advanced the idea that human society moved through a series of progressive stages from primitive communism through to slavery, feudalism and then capitalism; and that this, in turn, would be replaced by communism. For Marx, communism was seen as inevitable yet uncertain and desirable.

Marx founded the Communist Correspondence Committee in 1846 through which the various communists, socialists and other leftists across Europe could keep in contact with one another in the face of political repression. He then published The Communist Manifesto in 1848, which would prove to be one of the most influential communist texts ever written. He subsequently began work on a multi-volume epic that would examine and criticise the capitalist economy and the effect that it had upon politics, society and philosophy—the first volume of the work which was known as Capital: Critique of Political Economy was published in 1869. However, Marx and Engels were not only interested in writing about communism, as they were also active in supporting revolutionary activity that would lead to the creation of communist governments across Europe. They helped to found the International Workingmen's Association which would later become known as the First International to unite various communists and socialists, with Marx being elected to the Association's General Council.

Marx summarized his system with the slogan, "From each according to his ability, to each according to his needs." This phrasing used to formulate the principles of communism is borrowed from earlier socialist political activists such as August Becker and Louis Blanc.

Early development of Marxism 
During the latter half of the 19th century, various left-wing organisations across Europe continued to campaign against the many autocratic right-wing regimes that were then in power. In France, socialists set up a government known as the Paris Commune after the fall of Napoleon III in 1871, but they were soon overthrown and many of their members executed by counter-revolutionaries. Meanwhile, Karl Marx and Friedrich Engels joined the German Social-Democratic Party which had been created in 1875, but which was outlawed in 1879 by the German government, then led by Chancellor Otto von Bismarck, who deemed it to be a political threat due to its revolutionary nature and increasing number of supporters. In 1890, the party was re-legalised and by this time it had fully adopted Marxist principles. It subsequently achieved a fifth of the vote in the German elections and some of its leaders, such as August Bebel and Wilhelm Liebknecht, became well-known public figures.

At the time, Marxism took off not only in Germany, but it also gained popularity in Hungary, the Habsburg monarchy and the Netherlands, although it did not achieve such success in other European nations like the United Kingdom, where Marx and Engels had been based. Nonetheless, the new political ideology had gained sufficient support that an organisation was founded known as the Second International to unite the various Marxist groups around the world.

As Marxism took off, it also began to come under criticism from other European intellectuals, including fellow socialists and leftists. For instance, the Russian collectivist anarchist Mikhail Bakunin criticised what he believed were the flaws in the Marxian theory that the state would eventually dissolve under a Marxist government, instead he believed that the state would gain in power and become authoritarian. Criticism also came from other sociologists such as the German Max Weber, who whilst admiring Marx disagreed with many of his assumptions on the nature of society. Some Marxists tried to adapt to these criticisms and the changing nature of capitalism and Eduard Bernstein emphasised the idea of Marxists bringing legal challenges against the current administrations over the treatment of the working classes rather than simply emphasising violent revolution as more orthodox Marxists did. Other Marxists opposed Bernstein and other revisionists, with many including Karl Kautsky, Otto Bauer, Rudolf Hilferding, Rosa Luxemburg, Vladimir Lenin and Georgi Plekhanov sticking steadfast to the concept of violently overthrowing what they saw as the bourgeoisie-controlled government and instead establishing a dictatorship of the proletariat.

Periodisation of international communism of 1993 
The historical existence of the Communist International (Comintern) and the broader communist movement is divided among periods, regarding changes in the general policy it followed.
 The War Communism period (1918–1921) which saw the forming of the International, the Russian Civil War, a general revolutionary upheaval after the October Revolution resulting in the formation of the first communist parties across the world and the defeat of workers' revolutionary movements in Germany, Hungary, Finland and Poland.
 The New Economic Policy period (1921–1929) which marked the end of the civil war in Russia and new economic measures taken by the Bolshevik government, the toning down of the revolutionary wave in Europe and internal struggles within the Bolshevik Party and the Comintern after Lenin's death and before Stalin's absolute consolidation of power.
 The Third Period (1929–1934), an ultra-left turn which saw rapid industrialization and collectivization in the Soviet Union under Stalin's rule, the refusal by communists to cooperate with social democrats in other countries (labeling them social fascists) and the ultimate rise of Adolf Hitler in Germany which led to the abandonment of the hard-line policy of this period. These years also saw the complete subordination of all communist parties across the world to the directives of the All-Union Communist Party (Bolsheviks), making the Comintern more or less an organ of the Communist Party of the Soviet Union.
 The Popular Front period (1934–1939) which marked the call by Comintern to all popular and democratic forces (not just communist) to unite in popular fronts against fascism. Products of this period were the popular front governments in the French Third Republic and the Second Spanish Republic. However, this period was also marked by widespread purges of anyone suspected as an enemy of the Stalinist regime, both in the Soviet Union and abroad. These mass purges resulted in the breaking up of the Popular Front in Spain amidst the Spanish Civil War and the fall of Spain to Francisco Franco.
 The period of advocating peace (1939–1941), a result of the signing of the Molotov–Ribbentrop Pact which resulted in the Soviet invasion of Poland. In this period, communists were advocating non-participation in World War II, labeling the war as imperialist. The term revolutionary defeatism was used by Comintern in this period to refer to anti-war propaganda by communists in Western Europe against their national governments.
 The Eastern Front period, sometimes called the Second Popular Front (1941–1943), was the last period of the Comintern, starting immediately after the German invasion of the Soviet Union, with Stalin's 3 July 1941 call to the entire free world to unite and fight Nazism by all means. This was a period of militant anti-fascism, the emergence of national liberation movements all across occupied Europe and ultimately the dissolution of the Comintern in 1943.
 The Early Cold War (1947–1960) in which the Soviet Union and the Red Army installed the Eastern Bloc communist regimes in most of Eastern Europe (except for Yugoslavia and Albania, which had independent communist regimes). A major effort to support communist party activity in Western democracies, especially the Italian Communist Party and the French Communist Party, fell short of gaining positions in the government.
 The Late Cold War (1960–1970s) in which China turned against the Soviet Union and organized alternative communist parties in many countries. Intense attention was given to revolutionary movements in the Third World which were successful in some places such as Cuba and Vietnam. Communism was decisively defeated in other states, including Malaya and Indonesia. In 1972–1979, there was détente between the Soviet Union and the United States.
 The end of communism in Europe (1980–1992) in which Soviet client states were heavily on the defensive as in Afghanistan and Nicaragua. The United States escalated the conflict with very heavy military spending. After a series of short-lived leaders, Mikhail Gorbachev came to power in the Kremlin and began a policy of glasnost and perestroika, designed to revive the stagnating Soviet economy. European satellites led by Poland grew increasingly independent and in 1989 they all expelled the communist leadership. East Germany merged into West Germany with Moscow's approval. At the end of 1991, the Soviet Union itself was dissolved into non-communist independent states. Many communist parties around the world either collapsed, or became independent non-communist entities. However, China, North Korea, Laos, Vietnam and Cuba maintained communist regimes. After 1980, China adopted a market oriented economy that welcomed large-scale trade and friendly relations with the United States.

Early socialist states (1917–1944)

Russian Revolution, Leninism, and formation of the Soviet Union 

At the start of the 20th century, the Russian Empire was an autocracy controlled by Tsar Nicholas II, with millions of the country's largely agrarian population living in abject poverty. The anti-communist historian Robert Service noted that "poverty and oppression constituted the best soil for Marxism to grow in". The man most responsible for introducing the ideology into the country was Georgi Plekhanov, although the movement itself was largely organised by Vladimir Lenin, who had for a time been exiled to a prison camp in Siberia by the Tsarist government for his beliefs. A Marxist group known as the Russian Social Democratic Labour Party was formed in the country, although it soon divided into two main factions, namely the Bolsheviks led by Lenin and the Mensheviks led by Julius Martov. In 1905, there was a revolution against the Tsar's rule in which workers' councils known as soviets were formed in many parts of the country and the Tsar was forced to implement democratic reform, introducing an elected government, the Duma.

In 1917, with further social unrest against the Duma and its part in involving Russia in World War I, the Bolsheviks took power in the October Revolution. They began remodelling the country by nationalizing various industries and confiscating land from wealthy aristocrats and redistributing it amongst the peasants. They subsequently pulled out of the war against Germany by signing the Treaty of Brest-Litovsk which was unpopular amongst many in Russia, for it gave away large areas of land to Germany. From the outset, the new government faced resistance from a myriad of forces with differing perspectives, including anarchists, social democrats, who took power in the Democratic Republic of Georgia, Socialist-Revolutionaries, who formed the Komuch in Samara, Russia, scattered tsarist resistance forces known as the White Guard as well as Western powers. This led to the events of the Russian Civil War which the Bolsheviks won and subsequently consolidated their power over the entire country, centralising power from the Kremlin in the capital city of Moscow. In the early 1920s, Lenin began recruiting black workers, accusing American political parties of not doing more to campaign for black civil rights. A handful of African American activists were fascinated by communism, and Cyril Briggs led an organization called African Blood Brotherhood. In 1922, the Russian Socialist Federative Soviet Republic was officially redesignated to lead the Union of Soviet Socialist Republics, simply known as the Soviet Union.

In 1924, Lenin resigned as leader of the Soviet Union due to poor health and soon died, with Joseph Stalin subsequently taking over control.

Comintern, Mongolian invasion, and communist uprisings in Europe 

In 1919, the Bolshevik government in Russia instigated the creation of an international communist organisation that would act as the Third International after the collapse of the Second International in 1916. This was known as the Communist International, although it was commonly abbreviated as the Comintern. Throughout its existence, the Comintern would be dominated by the Kremlin despite its internationalist stance. Meanwhile, in 1921, the Soviet Union invaded its neighboring Mongolia to aid a popular uprising against the Chinese who then controlled the country, instituting a pro-Soviet government which declared the nation to be the Mongolian People's Republic in 1924.

The Comintern and other such Soviet-backed communist groups soon spread across much of the world, though particularly in Europe, where the influence of the recent Russian Revolution was still strong. In Germany, the Spartacist uprising took place in 1919 when armed Spartacus League communists attempted to set up a Bolshevik-style council republic, but the government put the rebellion down violently with the use of right-wing paramilitary groups, the Freikorps. The noted German communists Rosa Luxemburg and Karl Liebknecht were killed extrajudicially three days later. Within a few months, a group of communists seized power amongst public unrest in the German region of Bavaria, forming the Bavarian Soviet Republic, although once more this was put down violently by the Freikorps, who historians believe killed around 1,200 communists and their sympathisers.

That same year, political turmoil in Hungary following their defeat in World War I led to a coalition government of the Social Democratic Party and the Communist Party taking control. The Hungarian Communist Party led by Béla Kun soon became dominant and instituted various communist reforms in the country, but the country itself was subsequently invaded by its neighbouring Romania within a matter of months who overthrew the government, with its leaders either escaping abroad or being executed. In 1921, a communist revolt against the Kingdom of Italy occurred whilst supportive factory workers were on strike in Turin and Milan in northern Italy, but the government acted swiftly and put down the rebellion. That same year, a further communist rebellion took place in the Weimar Republic only to be crushed, but another occurred in 1923 which once again was also defeated by the government. The Bulgarian Communist Party had also attempted an uprising in 1923, but like most of their counterparts across Europe they were defeated.

Front organisations 

Communist parties were tight knit organizations that exerted tight control over the members. To reach sympathisers unwilling to join the party, front organizations were created that advocated party-approved positions. Under the leadership of Grigory Zinoviev in the Kremlin, the Comintern established fronts in many countries in the 1920s and after. To coordinate their activities, the Comintern set up various international umbrella organizations (linking groups across national borders) such as the Young Communist International (youth), Profintern (trade unions), Krestintern (peasants), International Red Aid (humanitarian aid), and Red Sport International (organized sports), among others. In Europe, front organizations were especially influential in Italy and France which became the base for Communist front organizer Willi Münzenberg in 1933. These organizations were dissolved by the late 1930s or early 1940s.

The Pan-Pacific Trade Union Secretariat (PPTUS) was set up in 1927 by the Profintern (the Comintern's trade union arm) with the mission of promoting communist trade unions in China, Japan, Korea, the Philippines, Australia, New Zealand and other nations in the western Pacific. Trapeznik (2009) says the PPTUS was a "Communist-front organization" and "engaged in overt and covert political agitation in addition to a number of clandestine activities".

There were numerous communist front organizations in Asia, many oriented to students and youth. According to one historian, in the labor union movement of the 1920s in Japan, the "Hyogikai never called itself a communist front but in effect, this was what it was". He points out it was repressed by the government "along with other communist front groups". In the 1950s, Scalapino argues: "The primary Communist-front organization was the Japan Peace Committee". It was founded in 1949.

Stalinism 

In 1924, Joseph Stalin, a key Bolshevik follower of Lenin, took power in the Soviet Union. Stalin was supported in his leadership by Nikolai Bukharin, but he had various important opponents in the government, most notably Lev Kamenev, Leon Trotsky, and Grigory Zinoviev. Stalin initiated his own process of building a communist society, creating a variant of communism known as Marxism–Leninism. As a part of this, he abandoned some of the capitalist, market policies that had been allowed to continue under Lenin such as the New Economic Policy. Stalinist policies radically altered much of the Soviet Union's agricultural production, modernising it by introducing tractors and other machinery, forced collectivisation of the farms and forced collection of grains from the peasants in accordance with predecided targets. There was food available for industrial workers, but those peasants who refused to move starved, especially in Kazakhstan and Ukraine. The All-Union Communist Party (Bolsheviks) targeted kulaks, who owned a little land.

Stalin took control of the Comintern and introduced a policy in the international organisation of opposing all leftists who were not Marxist–Leninists, labelling them to be social fascists, although many communists such as Jules Humbert-Droz disagreed with him on this policy, believing that the left should unite against the rise of right-wing movements like fascism across Europe. In the early 1930s, Stalin reversed course and promoted popular front movements whereby communist parties would collaborate with socialists and other political forces. A high priority was mobilizing wide support for the Republican cause in the Spanish Civil War.

Great Purge 

The Great Purge mainly operated from December 1936 to November 1938, although the features of arrest and summary trial followed by execution were well entrenched in the Soviet system since the days of Lenin as Stalin systematically destroyed the older generation of pre-1918 leaders. Stalin did so usually under the justification that the accused were enemy spies or deemed "enemies of the people"; in the Red Army, a majority of generals were executed and hundreds of thousands of other "enemies of the people" were sent to the gulag, where inhumane conditions in Siberia led a quick death.

The opening of the Soviet archives has vindicated the lower estimates put forth by the "revisionist school" scholars, despite the popular press continuing to use higher estimates and containing serious errors. By 2009, historian Archie Brown reported that estimates were now lower; about 1.7 million were arrested in 1937–1938 and half were shot.

Pre-war dissident communists 
The International Right Opposition and Trotskyism are examples of dissidents who still claim communism today, but they are not the only ones. In Germany, the split in the SPD had initially led to a variety of Communist unions and parties forming which included the councilist tendencies of the AAU-D, AAU-E and KAPD. Councilism had a limited impact outside of Germany, but a number of international organisations formed. In Spain, a fusion of left and right dissidents led to the formation of the POUM. Additionally, the Spanish CNT was associated with the development of the FAI political party, a non-Marxist party which stood for revolutionary communism.

Spreading communism (1945–1957) 
As the Cold War took effect around 1947, the Kremlin set up new international coordination bodies including the World Federation of Democratic Youth, the International Union of Students, the World Federation of Trade Unions, the Women's International Democratic Federation and the World Peace Council. Malcolm Kennedy says the "Communist 'front' system included such international organizations as the WFTU, WFDY, IUS, WIDF and WPC, besides a host of lesser bodies bringing journalists, lawyers, scientists, doctors and others into the widespread net".

The World Federation of Trade Unions (WFTU) was established in 1945 to unite trade union confederations across the world and it was based in Prague. While it had non-communist unions it was largely dominated by the Soviets. In 1949 the British, American and other non-Communist unions broke away to form the rival International Confederation of Free Trade Unions. The labor movement in Europe became so polarized between the communists unions and social democratic and Christian labor unions, whereas front operations could no longer hide the sponsorship and they became less important.

Soviet Union after World War II 

The devastation of the war resulted in a massive recovery program involving the rebuilding of industrial plants, housing and transportation as well as the demobilization and migration of millions of soldiers and civilians. In the midst of this turmoil during the winter of 1946–1947, the Soviet Union experienced the worst natural famine in the 20th century. There was no serious opposition to Stalin as the NKVD secret police continued to send possible suspects to the gulag.

Relations with the United States and Britain went from friendly to hostile, as they denounced Stalin's political controls over eastern Europe and his blockade of Berlin. By 1947, the Cold War had begun. Stalin himself believed that capitalism was a hollow shell and would crumble under increased non-military pressure exerted through proxies in countries like Italy. However, he greatly underestimated the economic strength of the West and instead of triumph saw the West build up alliances that were designed to permanently stop or contain Soviet expansion. In early 1950, Stalin gave the go-ahead for North Korea's invasion of South Korea, expecting a short war. He was stunned when the Americans entered and defeated the North Koreans, putting them almost on the Soviet border. Stalin supported China's entry into the Korean War which drove the Americans back to the prewar boundaries, but which escalated tensions. The United States decided to mobilize its economy for a long contest with the Soviets, built the hydrogen bomb and strengthened the NATO alliance that covered Western Europe.

According to Gorlizki and Khlevniuk (2004), Stalin's consistent and overriding goal after 1945 was to consolidate the nation's superpower status and in the face of his growing physical decrepitude to maintain his own hold on total power. Stalin created a leadership system that reflected historic czarist styles of paternalism and repression, yet was also quite modern. At the top, personal loyalty to Stalin counted for everything. However, Stalin also created powerful committees, elevated younger specialists and began major institutional innovations. In the teeth of persecution, Stalin's deputies cultivated informal norms and mutual understandings which provided the foundations for collective rule after his death.

Eastern Europe 

The military success of the Red Army in Central and Eastern Europe led to a consolidation of power in communist hands. In some cases, such as Czechoslovakia, this led to enthusiastic support for socialism inspired by the Communist Party and a Social Democratic Party willing to fuse. In other cases, such as Poland or Hungary, the fusion of the Communist Party with the Social Democratic Party was forcible and accomplished through undemocratic means. In many cases, the communist parties of Central Europe were faced with a population initially quite willing to reign in market forces, institute limited nationalisation of industry and supporting the development of intensive social welfare states, whereas broadly the population largely supported socialism. However, the purges of non-communist parties that supported socialism, combined with forced collectivisation of agriculture and a Soviet-bloc wide recession in 1953 led to deep unrest. This unrest first surfaced in Berlin in 1953, where Brecht ironically suggested that "the Party ought to elect a new People". However, Nikita Khrushchev's "Secret Speech" of 1956 opened up internal debate, even if members were unaware, in both the Polish and Hungarian communist parties. This led to the Polish crisis of 1956 which was resolved through change in Polish leadership and a negotiation between the Soviet and Polish parties over the direction of the Polish economy.

Hungarian Revolution of 1956 

The Hungarian Revolution of 1956 was a major challenge to Moscow's control of Eastern Europe. This revolution saw general strikes, the formation of independent workers councils, the restoration of the Social Democratic Party as a party for revolutionary communism of a non-Soviet variety and the formation of two underground independent communist parties. The mainstream Communist Party was controlled for a period of about a week by non-Soviet aligned leaders. Two non-communist parties that supported the maintenance of socialism also regained their independence. This flowering of dissenting communism was crushed by a combination of a military invasion supported by heavy artillery and airstrikes; mass arrests, at least a thousand juridical executions and an uncounted number of summary executions; the crushing of the Central Workers Council of Greater Budapest; mass refugee flight; and a worldwide propaganda campaign. The effect of the Hungarian Revolution on other communist parties varied significantly, resulting in large membership losses in Anglophone communist parties.

Prague Spring of 1968 

The Czechoslovak Communist Party began an ambitious reform agenda under Alexander Dubček. The plan to limit central control and make the economy more independent of the party threatened bedrock beliefs. On 20 August 1968, Soviet leader Leonid Brezhnev ordered a massive military invasion by Warsaw Pact forces that destroyed the threat of internal liberalization. At the same time, the Soviets threatened retaliation against the British-French-Israeli invasion of Egypt. The upshot was a collapse of any tendency toward détente and the resignations of more intellectuals from communist parties in the West.

West Germany 
West Germany and West Berlin were centers of East–West conflict during the Cold War and numerous communist fronts were established. For example, the East Germany organization Society for German–Soviet Friendship (GfDSF) had 13,000 members in West Germany, but it was banned in 1953 by some Länder as a communist front. The Democratic Cultural League of Germany started off as a series of genuinely pluralistic bodies, but in 1950–1951 came under the control of the communists. By 1952, the United States Embassy counted 54 "infiltrated organizations" which started independently as well as 155 "front organizations" which had been communist inspired from their start.

The Association of the Victims of the Nazi Regime was set up to rally West Germans under the anti-fascist banner, but it had to be dissolved when Moscow discovered it had been infiltrated by "Zionist agents".

China

Great Leap Forward 

Mao Zedong and the Chinese Communist Party came to power in China in 1949 as the Nationalists headed by the Kuomintang fled to the island of Taiwan. In 1950–1953, China engaged in a large-scale, undeclared war with the United States, South Korea and United Nations forces in the Korean War. While ended in a military stalemate, it gave Mao the opportunity to identify and purge elements in China that seemed supportive of capitalism. At first, there was close cooperation with Stalin, who sent in technical experts to aid the industrialization process along the line of the Soviet model of the 1930s. After Stalin's death in 1953, relations with Moscow soured—Mao thought Stalin's successors had betrayed the Communist ideal. Mao charged that Soviet leader Nikita Khrushchev was the leader of a "revisionist clique" which had turned against Marxism and Leninism was now setting the stage for the restoration of capitalism. The two nations were at sword's point by 1960. Both began forging alliances with communist supporters around the globe, thereby splitting the worldwide movement into two hostile camps.

Rejecting the Soviet model of rapid urbanization, Mao Zedong and his top aide Deng Xiaoping launched the Great Leap Forward in 1957–1961 with the goal of industrializing China overnight, using the peasant villages as the base rather than large cities. Private ownership of land ended and the peasants worked in large collective farms that were now ordered to start up heavy industry operations, such as steel mills. Plants were built in remote locations, despite the lack of technical experts, managers, transportation or needed facilities. Industrialization failed, but the main result was a sharp unexpected decline in agricultural output, which led to mass famine and millions of deaths. The years of the Great Leap Forward in fact saw economic regression, with 1958 through 1961 being the only years between 1953 and 1983 in which China's economy saw negative growth. Political economist Dwight Perkins argues, "Enormous amounts of investment produced only modest increases in production or none at all. [...] In short, the Great Leap was a very expensive disaster". Put in charge of rescuing the economy, Deng adopted pragmatic policies that the idealistic Mao disliked. For a while, Mao was in the shadows, but he returned to center stage and purged Deng and his allies in the Cultural Revolution (1966–1969).

Early post-war dissident communists 

Following the Second World War, Trotskyism was wracked by increasing internal divisions over analysis and strategy. This was combined with an industrial impotence that was widely recognised. Additionally, the success of Soviet-aligned parties in Europe and Asia led to the persecution of Trotskyite intellectuals such as the infamous purge of Vietnamese Trotskyists. The war had also strained social democratic parties in the West. In some cases, such as Italy, significant bodies of membership of the Social Democratic Party were inspired by the possibility of achieving advanced socialism. In Italy, this group, combined with dissenting communists, began to discuss theory centred on the experience of work in modern factories, leading to autonomist Marxist. In the United States, this theoretical development was paralleled by the Johnson–Forest Tendency whereas in France a similar impulse occurred.

Cold War and revisionism (1958–1979)

Maoism and Cultural Revolution in China 

The Cultural Revolution was an upheaval that targeted intellectuals and party leaders from 1966 through 1976. Mao's goal was to purify communism by removing pro-capitalists and traditionalists by imposing Maoist orthodoxy within the Chinese Communist Party. The movement paralyzed China politically and weakened the country economically, culturally and intellectually for years. Millions of people were accused, humiliated, stripped of power and either imprisoned, killed or most often sent to work as farm laborers. Mao insisted that these he labelled revisionists be removed through violent class struggle. The two most prominent militants were Marshall Lin Biao of the army and Mao's wife Jiang Qing. China's youth responded to Mao's appeal by forming Red Guard groups around the country. The movement spread into the military, urban workers and the Communist Party leadership itself. It resulted in widespread factional struggles in all walks of life. In the top leadership, it led to a mass purge of senior officials who were accused of taking a "capitalist road", most notably Liu Shaoqi and Deng Xiaoping. During the same period, Mao's personality cult grew to immense proportions. After Mao's death in 1976, the survivors were rehabilitated and many returned to power.

Cuban Revolution 

The Cuban Revolution was a successful armed revolt led by Fidel Castro's 26th of July Movement against the regime of Cuban dictator Fulgencio Batista. It ousted Batista on 1 January 1959, replacing his regime with Castro's revolutionary government. Castro's government later reformed along communist lines, becoming the present Communist Party of Cuba in October 1965. The United States response was highly negative, leading to a failed invasion attempt in 1961. The Soviets decided to protect its ally by stationing nuclear weapons in Cuba in 1962. In the Cuban Missile Crisis, the United States vehemently opposed the Soviet Union move. There was serious fear of nuclear war for a few days, but a compromise was reached by which Moscow publicly removed its weapons and the United States secretly removed its from bases in Turkey and promised never to invade.

African communism 

During the decolonization of Africa, the Soviet Union took a keen interest in that continent's independence movements and initially hoped that the cultivation of communist client states there would deny their economic and strategic resources to the West. Soviet foreign policy with regards to Africa assumed that newly independent African governments would be receptive to communist ideology and that the Soviets would have the resources to make them attractive as development partners. During the 1970s, the ruling parties of several sub-Saharan African states formally embraced communism, including the People's Republic of Benin, the People's Republic of Mozambique, the People's Republic of the Congo, the People's Democratic Republic of Ethiopia, and the People's Republic of Angola. Most of these regimes ensured the selective adoption and flexible application of communist theory set against a broad ideological commitment to Marxism or Leninism. The adoption of communism was often seen as a means to an end and used to justify the extreme centralization of power.

Angola was perhaps the only African state which made a longstanding commitment to communism, but this was severely hampered by its own war-burdened economy, rampant corruption and practical realities which allowed a few foreign companies to wield considerable influence despite the elimination of the domestic Angolan private sector and a substantial degree of central economic planning. Both Angola and Ethiopia built new social and political communist institutions modeled closely after those in the Soviet Union and Cuba. However, their regimes either dissolved after the collapse of the Soviet Union due to civil conflict or voluntarily repudiated communism in favour of social democracy.

Eurocommunism 

An important trend in several countries in Western Europe from the late 1960s into the 1980s was Eurocommunism. It was strongest in Spain's PCE, Finland's party and especially in Italy's PCI, where it drew on the ideas of Antonio Gramsci. It was developed by communist party members who were disillusioned with both the Soviet Union and China and sought an independent program. They accepted liberal parliamentary democracy and free speech as well as accepting with some conditions a capitalist market economy. They did not speak of the destruction of capitalism, but sought to win the support of the masses and by a gradual transformation of the bureaucracies. In 1978, the Communist Party of Spain replaced the historic "Marxist–Leninist" catchphrase with the new slogan of "Marxist, democratic and revolutionary". The movement faded in the 1980s and collapsed with the fall of communism in Eastern Europe in 1989.

Other forms

Anarcho-communism is a political philosophy and anarchist school of thought which advocates the abolition of the state, capitalism, wage labour, social hierarchies and private property (while retaining respect for personal property, along with collectively-owned items, goods and services) in favor of common ownership of the means of production and direct democracy as well as a horizontal network of workers' councils with production and consumption based on the guiding principle "From each according to his ability, to each according to his needs."

Left communism is a position held by the left wing of communism, which criticises the political ideas and practices espoused by Marxist–Leninists and social democrats. Left communists assert positions which they regard as more authentically Marxist than the views of Marxism–Leninism espoused by the Communist International after its Bolshevization by Joseph Stalin and during its second congress.

Libertarian Marxism is a broad scope of economic and political philosophies that emphasize the anti-authoritarian and libertarian aspects of Marxism.

End of the Eastern Bloc (1980–1992)

Reform and collapse (1980–1992) 

Social resistance to the policies of communist regimes in Eastern Europe accelerated in strength with the rise of the Solidarity, the first non-communist controlled trade union in the Warsaw Pact that was formed in the People's Republic of Poland in 1980.

In 1985, Mikhail Gorbachev rose to power in the Soviet Union and began policies of radical political reform involving political liberalisation called perestroika and glasnost. Gorbachev's policies were designed at dismantling authoritarian elements of the state that were developed by Stalin, aiming for a return to a supposed ideal Leninist state that retained a one-party structure while allowing the democratic election of competing candidates within the party for political office. Gorbachev also aimed to seek détente with the West and end the Cold War that was no longer economically sustainable to be pursued by the Soviet Union. The Soviet Union and the United States under President George H. W. Bush joined in pushing for the dismantlement of apartheid and oversaw the dismantlement of South African colonial rule over Namibia.

Meanwhile, the Eastern European communist states politically deteriorated in response to the success of the Polish Solidarity movement and the possibility of Gorbachev-style political liberalisation. In 1989, revolts began across Eastern Europe and China against communist regimes. In China, the government refused to negotiate with student protestors, resulting in the Tiananmen Square attacks that stopped the revolts by force.

The opening of a border gate between Austria and Hungary at the Pan-European Picnic on August 19, 1989, then set in motion a peaceful chain reaction, at the end of which there was no longer a GDR and the Eastern Bloc had disintegrated. It was the largest escape movement from East Germany since the Berlin Wall was built in 1961. But with the mass exodus at the Pan-European Picnic, the subsequent hesitant behavior of the Socialist Unity Party of East Germany and the non-intervention of the Soviet Union broke the dams. The revolts culminated with the revolt in East Germany against the communist regime of Erich Honecker. The event in East Germany developed into a popular mass revolt with sections of the Berlin Wall being torn down and East and West Berliners uniting. Gorbachev's refusal to use Soviet forces based in East Germany to suppress the revolt was seen as a sign that the Cold War had ended. Honecker was pressured to resign from office and the new government committed itself to reunification with West Germany. The Communist Party regime of Nicolae Ceaușescu in Romania was forcefully overthrown in the Romanian Revolution of 1989 and Ceaușescu was executed. The other Warsaw Pact regimes also fell during the Revolutions of 1989, with the exception of the Socialist People's Republic of Albania that continued until 1992.

Unrest and eventual collapse of communism also occurred in Yugoslavia, although for different reasons than those of the Warsaw Pact. The death of Josip Broz Tito in 1980 and the subsequent vacuum of strong leadership allowed the rise of rival ethnic nationalism in the multinational country. The first leader to exploit such nationalism for political purposes was Slobodan Milošević, who used Serbian nationalism to seize power as president of Serbia and demanded concessions to the Socialist Republic of Serbia and Serbs by the other republics in the Yugoslav federation. This resulted in a surge of Slovene and Croat nationalism in response and the collapse of the League of Communists of Yugoslavia in 1990, the victory of nationalists in multi-party elections in most of Yugoslavia's constituent republics and eventually civil war between the various nationalities beginning in 1991. Yugoslavia was dissolved in 1992.

The Soviet Union itself collapsed between 1990 and 1991, with a rise of secessionist nationalism and a political power dispute between Gorbachev and Boris Yeltsin, the new leader of the Russian Federation. With the Soviet Union collapsing, Gorbachev prepared the country to become a loose federation of independent states called the Commonwealth of Independent States. Hardline communist leaders in the military reacted to Gorbachev's policies with the August Coup of 1991 in which hardline communist military leaders overthrew Gorbachev and seized control of the government. This regime only lasted briefly as widespread popular opposition erupted in street protests and refused to submit. Gorbachev was restored to power, but the various Soviet republics were now set for independence. On 25 December 1991, Gorbachev officially announced the dissolution of the Soviet Union, ending the existence of the world's first communist state.

Contemporary communism (1993–present) 

With the fall of the communist governments in the Soviet Union and the Eastern Bloc, the influence of state-based Marxist–Leninist ideologies in the world was weakened, but there are still many communist movements of various types and sizes around the world. Three other communist nations, particularly those in East Asia such as the People's Republic of China, Vietnam and Laos, all moved toward market economies, but without major privatization of the state sector during the 1980s and 1990s (see socialism with Chinese characteristics and doi moi for more details). Spain, France, Portugal and Greece have very publicly strong communist movements that play an open and active leading role in the vast majority of their labor marches and strikes as well as also anti-austerity protests, all of which are large, pronounced events with much visibility. Worldwide marches on International Workers Day sometimes give a clearer picture of the size and influence of current communist movements, particularly within Europe.

Cuba has recently emerged from the crisis sparked by the fall of the Soviet Union given the growth in its volume of trade with its new allies Venezuela and China (the former of whom has recently adopted a socialism of the 21st century according to Hugo Chávez). Various other countries throughout Latin America and the Caribbean have also taken similar shifts to more clearly socialistic policies and rhetoric in a phenomenon academics are calling the pink tide.

North Korea claims that its success in avoiding the downfall of socialism is a result of its homegrown ideology of Juche which it adopted in the 1970s, replacing Marxism–Leninism. Cuba has an ambassador to North Korea and China still protects North Korean territorial integrity even as it simultaneously refuses to supply the state with material goods or other significant assistance.

In Nepal, the Communist Party of Nepal (Unified Marxist–Leninist) leader Man Mohan Adhikari briefly became Prime Minister of Nepal and national leader from 1994 to 1995 and the Maoist guerrilla leader Prachanda was elected Prime Minister by the Constituent Assembly of Nepal in 2008. Prachanda has since been deposed as Prime Minister, leading the Maoists to abandon their legalistic approach and return to their typical street actions and militancy and to lead sporadic general strikes using their quite substantial influence on the Nepalese labor movement. These actions have oscillated between mild and intense, only the latter of which tends to make world news. They consider Prachanda's removal to be unjust. Since the 2008 Nepal has been ruled by a coalition of communist parties: Communist Party of Nepal (Unified Marxist–Leninist) and Communist Party of Nepal (Maoist Centre) which they merged in 2018 in the Nepal Communist Party

The previous national government of India depended on the parliamentary support of the Communist Party of India (Marxist) and Communist Party of India. Presently CPI(M) along with CPI leads the state government in Kerala. The armed wing of the Communist Party of India (Maoist), the People's Liberation Guerrilla Army, is fighting the Naxalite–Maoist insurgency against the Government of India and is active in some parts of the country. Indian government forces have been successful in eliminating insurgency to quite an extent.

In Cyprus, the veteran communist Dimitris Christofias of AKEL won the 2008 presidential election.

In Ukraine and Russia, the communists came second in the 2002 Ukrainian parliamentary election and the 2003 Russian legislative election, respectively. The Communist Party of the Russian Federation remains strong in Russia, but the 2014 Ukrainian parliamentary election following the Russian invasion of Ukraine and the annexation of Crimea resulted in the loss of its 32 members and no Verkhovna Rada representation by the Communist Party of Ukraine. The party has been banned since 2015.

In the Czech Republic, the Communist Party of Bohemia and Moravia came third in the 2002 elections as did the Portuguese Communist Party in 2005.

In South Africa, the South African Communist Party (SACP) is a member of the Tripartite alliance alongside the African National Congress and the Congress of South African Trade Unions. Sri Lanka has communist ministers in their national governments.

In Zimbabwe, former President Robert Mugabe of the Zimbabwe African National Union – Patriotic Front, the country's longstanding leader, was a professed communist.

Colombia has been in the midst of a civil war which has been waged since 1966 between the Colombian government and aligned right-wing paramilitaries against two communist guerrilla groups, namely the Revolutionary Armed Forces of Colombia–People's Army (FARC–EP) and the National Liberation Army (ELN).

The Revolutionary Communist Party, USA led by its chairman Bob Avakian currently organizes for a revolution in the United States to overthrow the capitalist system and replace it with a socialist state.

As of the early 2020s, the Philippines is still experiencing a low-scale guerrilla insurgency by the New People's Army, the armed wing of the outlawed Communist Party of the Philippines. Actions of an armed group likely affiliated with NPA resulted in eight casualties after a gunfight with the Philippine Armed Forces in late March 2021.

See also 
 Foreign relations of China
 Foreign relations of Cuba
 Foreign relations of the Soviet Union
 Foreign relations of Vietnam

References

Bibliography

Further reading 
 Books
 Borkenau, Franz. World communism; a history of the Communist International (1938) online 
 Crozier, Brian. The Rise and Fall of the Soviet Empire (1999), long detailed popular history
 
 Deakin, F. W. ed. A history of world communism (1975) online 
 Furet, François. The Passing of an Illusion: The Idea of Communism in the Twentieth Century (1999).
 Garver, John W. China's Quest: The History of the Foreign Relations of the People's Republic (2nd ed. 2018) comprehensive scholarly history. excerpt
 Harvey, Robert, A Short History of Communism (2004), .
 Kotkin, Stephen. Stalin, Volume I: Paradoxes of Power, 1878-1928 (2014) highly detailed scholarly biography; vol 2 Stalin: Waiting for Hitler, 1929-1941 (2017)
 Pathak, Rakesh, and Yvonne Berliner. Communism in Crisis 1976-89 (2012)
 Pipes, Richard. Communism: A History (2003)
 Pons, Silvio and Robert Service, eds. A Dictionary of 20th-Century Communism (Princeton University Press, 2010). 944 pp.  online review
 Priestland, David. The Red Flag: A History of Communism (2010)
 Sandle, Mark. Communism (2nd ed. 2011), short introduction
 Service, Robert. Lenin: A Biography (2000) excerpt and text search; also online 
 Service, Robert. Stalin (2005) online 
 Seton-Watson, Hugh. From Lenin to Khrushchev, the history of world communism (1954) online 
 Taubman, William. Khrushchev: The Man and His Era (2004) excerpt and text search; also complete text 
 Taubman, William. Gorbachev: His Life and Times (2018)
 Tucker, Robert C. Stalin as Revolutionary, 1879-1929 (1973); Stalin in Power: The Revolution from Above, 1929-1941. (1990) online edition a standard biography; online at ACLS e-books
 Ulam, Adam B. Expansion and Coexistence: Soviet Foreign Policy 1917-73 (1974) online 

 Journals
 American Communist History (United States)
 Communisme (France)
 Twentieth Century Communism (United Kingdom)

 Primary sources
 Daniels, Robert V., ed. A Documentary History of Communism in Russia: From Lenin to Gorbachev (1993)
 Daniels, Robert V. ed. A Documentary History of Communism: Communism and the World (1985)
 Gruber, Helmut. International Communism in the Era of Lenin: A Documentary History (1967)

 Memoirs
 
 
 
 

 Animation
 Mapping the fall of communism

Communism
Communism
Communism